Aaron Chalmers (born 26 May 1987) is an English retired mixed martial artist, reality television personality, and professional boxer. He appeared in the reality shows Geordie Shore and Ex on the Beach. He competed in Bellator MMA.

Career

Television personality 
On 4 April 2014, it was announced that Chalmers had joined the cast of Geordie Shore for the eighth series. He left the series after season 16.

He appeared in the sixth series of Ex on the Beach as the ex of Maisie Gillespie. The series began airing on 17 January 2017. In 2019, Chalmers began starring in the MTV series Geordie Shore OGs, a spinoff series of Geordie Shore. Before becoming well-known, he worked on an oil rig.

Mixed martial arts career

BAMMA (2017)
Having previously practised Muay Thai, he had his first MMA fight in May 2017, beating Greg Jenkins. He won his second professional fight at BAMMA 31 at the SSE Arena beating Alex Thompson by KO on 15 September 2017. His third and final fight for BAMMA was a win (by TKO) against Karl Donaldson on 15 December in his home town arena the Metro Radio Arena in Newcastle.

Bellator (2018–2021)
In March 2018, Chalmers announced he would be joining Bellator. He had his first fight against Ash Griffiths on 25 May 2018 for the Bellator 200 event at Wembley Arena. He won the fight via technical submission in the first round. In his second outing for the promotion, Chalmers suffered his first defeat as a professional fighter, as he was defeated by American Corey Browning by submission in the third round. In June 2019, Chalmers returned to the win column with a submission victory over Fred Freeman.

Chalmers next faced Austin Clem in a welterweight bout at Bellator 240 on February 22, 2020. He lost the bout via unanimous decision (30-27 x2, 30-26).

Chalmers announced his retirement from MMA competition in an IGTV video posted on 18 February 2021.

Boxing career

Professional career 
Chalmers made his switch from MMA to Boxing in 2022. Chalmers had his first professional fight against Alexander Zeledon on June 17, 2022. Chalmers won the bout by outpointing his opponent 39-37 on the judges cards.

Exhibition bout 
In January 2023, it was announced that Chalmers would face former unified multiple division champion Floyd Mayweather Jr. in a exhibition bout, after his original opponent for the fight, Muay Thai fighter Liam Harrison, pulled out. The bout took place at the O2 Arena in London, England on February 25, 2023. The bout went the full 8 rounds, there was no scoring and it ended without an official verdict

Filmography

Mixed martial arts record

|-
|Loss
|align=center|5–2
|Austin Clem
|Decision (unanimous)
|Bellator 240
|
|align=center| 3
|align=center| 5:00
|Dublin, Ireland
|Welterweight bout.
|-
|Win
|align=center|5–1
|Fred Freeman
|Submission (triangle choke)
|Bellator 223
|
|align=center| 2
|align=center| 4:05
|London, England
|Catchweight (160 lbs) bout.
|-
|Loss
|align=center|4–1
|Corey Browning
|Submission (heel hook)
|Bellator Newcastle
|
|align=center|3
|align=center|0:20
|Utilita Arena, Newcastle, England, United Kingdom
|Lightweight debut
|-
|Win
|align=center|4–0
|Ash Griffiths
|Technical Submission (guillotine choke)
|Bellator 200
|
|align=center|1
|align=center|1:55
|The SSE Arena, London, England, United Kingdom
|Catchweight (163 lbs) bout.
|-
|Win
|align=center|3–0
|Karl Donaldson
|TKO (punches)
|BAMMA 33
|
|align=center| 1
|align=center| 0:43
|Metro Radio Arena, Newcastle, England, United Kingdom
|
|-
| Win
|align=center| 2–0
|Alex Thompson
|KO (punch)
|BAMMA 31
|
|align=center| 1
|align=center| 0:30
|The SSE Arena, London, England, United Kingdom
|
|-
| Win
|align=center|1–0
|Greg Jenkins
|Submission (Americana)
|BAMMA 29
|
|align=center|1
|align=center|2:12
|Genting Arena, Birmingham, England, United Kingdom
|
|-

Boxing record

Professional

Exhibition

External links

References

Geordie Shore
People from Newcastle upon Tyne
Living people
1987 births
English male mixed martial artists
Welterweight mixed martial artists
Mixed martial artists utilizing Brazilian jiu-jitsu
English practitioners of Brazilian jiu-jitsu